Illiesa Toga is a Fijian former professional rugby league footballer who represented Fiji in the 1995 World Cup.

Playing career
In 1994 Toga played one match for the Western Suburbs club in the NSWRL Premiership. At the end of the year he played for Fiji against France.

In 1995 he was selected by Fiji for the 1995 World Cup. He played in two matches at the tournament.

References

Living people
Fijian rugby league players
Fiji national rugby league team players
1965 births
Rugby league wingers
Rugby league second-rows
Western Suburbs Magpies players
Place of birth missing (living people)